Vandières is a commune in the Meurthe-et-Moselle department in north-eastern France.

People
Vandières was the birthplace of:
 John of Gorze (d. 975), monastic reformer and diplomat

See also
Communes of the Meurthe-et-Moselle department

References

Communes of Meurthe-et-Moselle